Men's Slalom World Cup 1986/1987

Final point standings

In Men's Slalom World Cup 1986/87 the best five results count.

External links
FIS-ski.com - World Cup standings - Slalom 1987

World Cup
FIS Alpine Ski World Cup slalom men's discipline titles